Symeon I of Trebizond ({{lang-el|), (? – autumn 1486) was Ecumenical Patriarch of Constantinople three times: for a short time in 1466, from 1471 to 1475 and from 1482 to 1486. In 1484 he presided over the Synod of Constantinople of 1484 which repudiated the Union of Florence.

Life
Symeon was born between 1400 and 1420 to a noble family of the Empire of Trebizond. After Trebizond's fall to the Ottomans in 1461, all the nobles of the former empire were forced by Mehmed the Conqueror to move to Istanbul (Constantinople) and Symeon too, who was already a monk, went to the capital. The Trapezuntine nobility formed a separate faction among the Greeks of the capital, led probably by the scholar and politician George Amiroutzes. This faction supported Symeon as its own candidate for the patriarchal throne against the faction led by lay archons such as the Great Chartophylax George Galesiotes and the Grand Ecclesiarch (i.e. Head Sacristan) Manuel, the future Patriarch Maximus III.

In autumn 1466 Symeon successfully obtained the throne after he presented the Ottoman government with 2000 pieces of gold, thus beginning a simoniac practice that marked the history of the Patriarchate of Constantinople for the following centuries. Here a new player made an entrance in disputing the patriarchal throne: Mara Branković, daughter of the Serbian Despot Đurađ Branković and one of the stepmothers of Mehmed II. Although Mara remained a lifelong Christian, she was quite influential with Mehmed. Mara was outraged by the simoniac action of Symeon, and she went to Istanbul to complain to Mehmed. In response to her requests, and to a donation by her of 2000 pieces of gold, the Sultan deposed Symeon and appointed to the Patriarchate the candidate of Mara, Dionysius I. Symeon retired for some years in a monastery near Stenimachos.

The reign of Dionysius was marked by the opposition to him by both of the other factions, including Symeon's. He was finally deposed at the end of 1471 after false accusations that he had converted to Islam and had been circumcised. Afterwards Symeon paid a further 2000 pieces of gold and allegedly promised to the Sultan to suppress designs for an anti-Ottoman revolt in Trebizond, and so he became Patriarch. Actually in May 1472 there was a failed attempt to capture the city led by Caterino Zeni and Alexios Komnenos (a nephew of David of Trebizond), supported by Uzun Hassan. Symeon sided with the Ottoman Sultan and in June 1472 he deposed the Metropolitan of Trebizond Pankratios, who was involved in the rebellion, and replaced him with another bishop, Dorotheos, a former Metropolitan of Athens, more aligned with the Ottomans. The second reign of Symeon was marked by an increased debt up to 7000 florins, and on 10 October 1474 the Holy Synod also accepted to pay an annual fee of 2000 florins to the Ottoman Government. Consequently, in the winter of 1474 Symeon was forced to begin searching for funds. On his return to Istanbul in early 1475, Symeon was outbid by Raphael I, probably supported by Mara Brankovic. Raphael could not pay the amount he had promised after a year and he was overthrown by Maximus III, the leader of the faction of the Constantinopolitan nobles.

Maximus III died on 3 April 1482 and Symeon returned on the throne for the third time until autumn 1486, when he was succeeded by Nephon II. Symeon died shortly after, surely before 1488, without making his will, and his rich inheritance was heavily contended for after his death. The most remarkable act of his third and last reign was the Synod of Constantinople of 1484.

Disputed chronology
There is no consensus among scholars concerning the chronology of the first reign of Symeon. Many scholars, such as Kiminas (2009), Runciman (1985), Grumel (1958) and Bishop Germanos of Sardeis (1933-8), as well as the official website of the Ecumenical Patriarchate, follow the chronicles of Dorotheos of Monemvasia and place the reign of Symeon I after Mark II.

Laurent (1968), followed by Podskalsky (1988), believes that the clashes with Symeon happened when Mark was still Metropolitan of Adrianople, and place Symeon's reign before Mark's. For a comparison of the main proposals, see the List of Patriarchs of Constantinople.

Notes


Sources

 
 
  

15th-century patriarchs of Constantinople
Byzantine Pontians
1486 deaths